Starovo is a rural locality (a village) in Churovskoye Rural Settlement, Sheksninsky District, Vologda Oblast, Russia. The population was 10 as of 2002.

Geography 
Starovo is located 42 km northeast of Sheksna (the district's administrative centre) by road. Borisovo is the nearest rural locality.

References 

Rural localities in Sheksninsky District